Manuel Dalmau (born 26 October 1961) is a Puerto Rican windsurfer. He competed in the Windglider event at the 1984 Summer Olympics.

References

External links
 

1961 births
Living people
Puerto Rican male sailors (sport)
Puerto Rican windsurfers
Olympic sailors of Puerto Rico
Sailors at the 1984 Summer Olympics – Windglider
Place of birth missing (living people)